Lilgomde is the name of several settlements in Burkina Faso. It may refer to:

 Lilgomde, Baskouré
 A neighborhood in Dimistenga, Gounghin Department, Kouritenga Province